Amonova is a rural locality (a village) in Stepanovskoye Rural Settlement, Kudymkarsky District, Perm Krai, Russia. The population was 51 as of 2010.

Geography 
Amonova is located 12 km southwest of Kudymkar (the district's administrative centre) by road. Borisova is the nearest rural locality.

References 

Rural localities in Kudymkarsky District